Spring Creek Township is the name of some places in the U.S. state of Pennsylvania:

Spring Creek Township, Elk County, Pennsylvania
Spring Creek Township, Warren County, Pennsylvania

Pennsylvania township disambiguation pages